The Muqbil is a Pashtun tribe, cousins of the Zadrans and Mangals. They mostly reside in Said Karam District, Paktia Province. They can be further divided into five clans: Musakhel, Sultak, Ahmadkhel, Hasankhel, and Bobaki.

References

Sources
Ethnic Identity in Afghanistan, Center for Culture and Conflict Studies, US Naval Postgraduate School

Karlani Pashtun tribes
Paktia Province